The 2nd Politburo of the Workers' Party of Vietnam (WPV), formally the 2nd Political Bureau of the Central Committee of the Workers' Party of Vietnam (Vietnamese: Bộ Chính trị Ban Chấp hành trung ương Đảng Lao động Việt Nam II), was elected at the 1st Plenary Session of the 2nd Central Committee in the immediate aftermath of the 2nd National Congress.

Composition

Members

Alternates

References

Bibliography
 Chân dung 19 ủy viên Bộ Chính trị khóa XII